The Myer Foundation is a major Australian philanthropic organisation.

History
The Sidney Myer Charitable Trust was established by the will of Sidney Myer, who died in 1934, leaving a portion of his estate for the benefit of the community. Myer's will was proved at £922,000. The most famous philanthropic funding by the Sidney Myer Fund was for the construction of the Sidney Myer Music Bowl in the Kings Domain, Melbourne in 1958, which is named in his honour.

In 1959, The Myer Foundation was established by Sidney's sons, Baillieu and Ken Myer – their sisters, Neilma Gantner and Lady Southey, became founding members. The Myer Foundation was established in order to award grants in sectors not covered by Sidney Myer's will. The Myer Foundation was endowed in 1992, after Ken Myer died, leaving most of his estate to the foundation.

The fund and foundation have been supported by four generations of Myer family members. In 2011, Carrillo Gantner , grandson of Sidney Myer through Sidney's daughter Neilma Gantner, was chair of the fund, while Martyn Myer , Sidney's grandson through Ken Myer, was president of the Myer Foundation.

In 2017, the foundation collaborated with the Tim Fairfax Family Foundation and the Keir Foundation in creating an initiative called A New Approach, to address a gap in up-to-date and accurate research and data about arts and cultural philanthropy.

Governance
, members of the Myer family involved in the governance of the foundation and fund include:

Andrew Myer : chair of Sidney Myer Fund (since 2020)
Sidney Myer : trustee
Sally Lindsay: trustee
Dr Anna Foley: trustee
Rupert Myer : president of the Myer Foundation (since 2020)
Emily Myer: vice-president
Lady Southey : life governor
Carrillo Gantner , life governor
Martyn Myer : life governor

Awards and fellowships

Sidney Myer Performing Arts Awards were created by the Sidney Myer Fund trustees  in 1984, to commemorate the 50th anniversary of the death of Sidney Myer. 
 there are three awards, given annually: an Individual Award, a Group Award and a Facilitator's Prize.

Each of the ten annual fellowships is awarded to an individual, with no restrictions or required outcomes necessary on the  that is given tax-free over two years, but it is expected that the recipients remain in Australia for this time. Mid-career Australian artists, arts managers, and "thought leaders" in the humanities are all eligible. The choice of recipients by the selection panel is based on two criteria: outstanding talent, and exceptional courage. Financial hardship is not considered. Many Indigenous Australian creatives have been Sidney Myer Creative Fellows, including Jonathan Jones, Alexis Wright, Ellen van Neerven, Eric Avery, Vernon Ah Kee, and (in 2022) artist Vincent Namatjira.

References

External links
 

Foundations based in Australia